Iradj Alexander (born September 17, 1975 in Locarno) is a race car driver.

From 2001 until 2004 he competed in the FIA GT Championship for JMB Ferrari, although 2002 was his only full season. He also competed in the American Le Mans Series (2003), French GT Championship (2001) and Barber Dodge Pro Series (1999). In 1996 he won his only championship, coming out on top in Swiss Formula Ford.

In 2007 Iradj Alexander races in the Le Mans Series, engaged by the new team Swiss Spirit. Alexander joins Jean-Denis Delétraz and Marcel Fässler in Monza.

Alexander fulfills Lola B07 Audi's search to represent each linguistic area of Switzerland.

Complete motorsports results

American Open-Wheel racing results
(key) (Races in bold indicate pole position, races in italics indicate fastest race lap)

Barber Dodge Pro Series

24 Hours of Le Mans results

External links
Iradj Alexander's site

Swiss racing drivers
Living people
French Formula Renault 2.0 drivers
24 Hours of Le Mans drivers
1975 births
European Le Mans Series drivers
International GT Open drivers
Barber Pro Series drivers
24 Hours of Spa drivers
24 Hours of Daytona drivers
People from Locarno
24H Series drivers
Sportspeople from Ticino

Rebellion Racing drivers
AF Corse drivers
Le Mans Cup drivers